Cristian Nazarit Truque (born August 13, 1990) is a Colombian former professional footballer who last played for Qatari Club Al Ahli.

Career

Club
Nazarit began his career in the youth ranks of América de Cali. In 2008, he moved to Independiente Santa Fe and eventually became a key player for the club, making 42 league appearances and scoring 16 goals. In early February 2011, Nazarit was linked to a move from Independiente Santa Fe to Independiente de Avellaneda in Argentina, but he did not join the club.

In May 2011, after completing a short trial period, Nazarit joined Major League Soccer club Chicago Fire. He made his official league debut on May 28, 2011 in a game against the San Jose Earthquakes. He had 3 shots in the game including one that hit both posts, which was finished by Dominic Oduro.

On December 7, 2011 the Chicago Fire announced they had released Nazarit and teammate Gabriel Ferrari.

He took trial term in Winter training camp with FC Gifu and then signed them for 2014 season. He scored 17 goals for the club then transferred to Consadole Sapporo for 2015 season.

International
Nazarit was a starter in the Colombian under-17 team that made it to the Round of 16 of the 2007 FIFA U-17 World Cup. He was Colombia's leading scorer during the qualifiers, and was the second top scorer of the tournament.

Colombia national team coach Jorge Luis Pinto invited Nazarit to the training camp in October 2007 to train with the Colombia national team that would start off qualifiers at home with Brazil, but he has yet to make his senior international debut.

Club statistics
.

References

External links

1990 births
Living people
Colombian footballers
Colombian expatriate footballers
Association football forwards
América de Cali footballers
Independiente Medellín footballers
Independiente Santa Fe footballers
Chicago Fire FC players
Deportivo Cali footballers
Deportivo Pasto footballers
Deportes Concepción (Chile) footballers
FC Gifu players
Hokkaido Consadole Sapporo players
Águilas Doradas Rionegro players
Al Ahli SC (Doha) players
Footballers at the 2007 Pan American Games
Pan American Games competitors for Colombia
Expatriate soccer players in the United States
Colombian expatriate sportspeople in Chile
Categoría Primera A players
Major League Soccer players
J2 League players
Primera B de Chile players
Expatriate footballers in Chile
Expatriate footballers in Japan
Expatriate footballers in Qatar
Qatar Stars League players
People from Tolima Department